Powerlink Queensland (formally Queensland Electricity Transmission Corporation Limited) is an electricity transmission system operator owned by the Government of Queensland which operates the high-voltage electricity transmission infrastructure in Queensland.

History
Powerlink Queensland was created in 1995  after the corporatisation and restructure of the vertically integrated Queensland power industry.  It was established under the Government Owned Corporation Act 1993 and is a registered public company under the Corporations Act 2001.

Operations
Powerlink is a transmission network service provider within the National Electricity Market (NEM). It does not buy or sell electricity; instead it transports it between participants within the NEM. Powerlink is a regulated monopoly business, with revenues set by the Australian Energy Regulator.

The transmission network, operated by Powerlink Queensland, extends  from north of Cairns to the New South Wales border, and comprises  of transmission lines and 139 substations.

Its network connects to New South Wales via the Queensland – New South Wales Interconnector (QNI). It also has a DC connection to NSW via the smaller Terranora interconnector.  Powerlink is a member of Grid Australia which represents the owners of Australia's electricity transmission networks in the National Electricity Market and Western Australia.  It has been appointed by the Queensland State Government as the jurisdictional planning body for Queensland to assess the capability of Queensland's transmission network to meet forecast electricity load growth.

Powerlink has adopted live high voltage substation maintenance practices on voltages up to 330 kV and is currently the only transmission utility in Australia to use these techniques. Its laboratory provides specialist testing and diagnostic services.

References

External links

National Association of Testing Authorities, Australia
Australian Energy Market Operator
Energy Regulator

Government-owned companies of Queensland
Electric power transmission system operators in Australia
Energy in Queensland
Government-owned energy companies
Companies based in Brisbane
1995 establishments in Australia
Companies established in 1995